The City of Lincoln Council is the local authority for the district of Lincoln, in the county of Lincolnshire, England. The council consists of 33 councillors, three for each of the 11 wards in the city. It is currently controlled by the Labour Party, led by Ric Metcalfe. The administrative headquarters is at Lincoln City Hall although council meetings are held at the guildhall.

History 
The city of Lincoln had been an ancient borough and was made a county corporate in 1409 with its own court of quarter sessions, making it independent from the Lindsey Quarter Sessions. The borough corporation was reformed under the Municipal Corporations Act 1835 to become a municipal borough. When elected county councils were established under the Local Government Act 1888 to take over the local government functions of the quarter sessions, Lincoln retained its independence, becoming a county borough, therefore running independently from Lindsey County Council.

On 1 April 1974, under the Local Government Act 1972, Lincoln was reconstituted to become a non-metropolitan district, altering its powers and responsibilities but keeping the same area and name. The separate county councils which had existed for each of the Parts of Lincolnshire were also amalgamated to create a single Lincolnshire County Council for the first time, with responsibility for county-level services in the city of Lincoln too.

See also 
 City of Lincoln Council elections

References

Non-metropolitan district councils of England
Local authorities in Lincolnshire
Council